Kathikund is a village in the Kathikund CD block in the Dumka Sadar subdivision of the Dumka district in the Indian state of Jharkhand.

Geography

Location

Overview
The map shows a large area, which is a plateau with low hills, except in the eastern portion where the Rajmahal hills intrude into this area and the Ramgarh hills are there. The south-western portion is just a rolling upland. The entire area is overwhelmingly rural with only small pockets of urbanisation.

Note: The full screen map is interesting. All places marked on the map are linked in the full screen map and one can easily move on to another page of his/her choice. Enlarge the full screen map to see what else is there – one gets railway connections, many more road connections and so on.

Area

Demographics
According to the 2011 Census of India, Bara Kathikund had a total population of 270, of which 145 (54%) were males and 125 (46%) were females. Population in the age range 0–6 years was 57. The total number of literate persons in Bara Kathikund was 213 (65.73% of the population over 6 years).

According to the 2011 Census of India, Chhota Kathikund had a total population of 27, of which 14 (52%) were males and 13 (48%) were females. Population in the age range 0–6 years was 1. The total number of literate persons in Chhota Kathikund was 26 (80.77% of the population over 6 years).

Civic administration

Police station
There is a police station at Kathikund.

CD block HQ
Headquarters of Kathikund CD block is at Kathikund village.

Education
Kasturba Gandhi Balika Vidyalaya, Kathikund, is a Hindi-medium girls only institution established in 2007. It has facilities for teaching from class VI to class XII.

Government High School Kathikund is a Hindi-medium coeducational institution established in 1955. It has facilities for teaching from class IX to class XII.

Dr. J.M. Inter College Kathikund is a Hindi-medium coeducational institution established in 1985. It has facilities for teaching in classes XI and XII.

Project Girls High School Kathikund is a Hindi-medium girls only institution established in 1984. It has facilities for teaching from class VIII to class X.

References

Villages in Dumka district